Ewa Różańska is a Polish hammer thrower. She is a 2022 European Championships Silver medallist in Munich.

References

External links
 

2000 births
Living people
Sportspeople from Greater Poland Voivodeship
Polish female hammer throwers
European Athletics Championships medalists